Monkey Puzzle is a 2008 Australian film about several friends who get lost in the wilderness.

The film was shot on location in the Blue Mountains.

References

External links

Monkey Puzzle review at Filmink Magazine
Monkey Puzzle review on At the Movies
Monkey Puzzle review at Urban Cinefile

Australian drama films
2008 films
2000s English-language films
2000s Australian films